Nahin Abhi Nahin is a 1980 Pakistani romantic Urdu film directed by Nazar-ul-Islam. The movie introduced the new actors Faisal, Ayaz Naik, and Arzoo. While the star actress Shabnam was in the lead role. Nahin Abhi Nahin was a golden jubilee hit of the year. The movie song, "Saman wo Khawab sa saman", composed by Robin Ghosh and vocalized by Akhlaq Ahmed, became a very popular track. The film was based on 1971 American film Summer of '42.

The film was ranked among the "Top ten films" of the Pakistani cinema by the critic Aijaz Gul  for "Asian Film Journeys: Selection from Cinemaya".

Plot
A teenage student, who is curious about sex and romance, misinterprets the affectionate gestures of an attractive lady and falls in love with her. Meanwhile, he meets another girl of his own age group and she starts liking him, but he continues to be obsessed with that older woman. The girl tries to convince him that it is a mismatch. But then, a naughty friend of his, encourages him to express his feelings to that lady. He actually does that. The angry lady scolds him for his cheap thoughts and makes it clear to him that she was kind to him only because he resembled her deceased younger brother. The ashamed and guilty teenager tries to commit suicide but is saved timely. Then the girl proposes to him to be her boyfriend but the boy has now learned his lesson. He refuses her offer by saying,  "Our elders are right. Flowers that bloom before their time also die prematurely. I shall eat this fruit but ... no, not just yet (nahin abhi nahin)."

Cast
 Shabnam
 Faisal
 Ayaz Naik
 Arzoo
 Deeba
 Qavi
 Rangeela
 Mirza Shai
 Gurj Babu
 Naina
 Ahmad Ali

Guest stars: Khalid Saleem Mota, Ilyas Kashmiri, Allauddin, Nanha, and Saqi

Soundtrack
  	Samaan Woh Khawab Sa Samaan... Singer: Akhlaq Ahmed, Poet: Suroor Barabankvi
  	Us Nay Dekha, Main Nay Dekha... Singer: Akhlaq Ahmed, Nayyara Noor
  	Woh Waqt Tha Purana... Singer: A. Nayyar, Akhlaq Ahmed

Reception and box office
The movie did well at the box office and crowned as a golden jubilee hit. It completed 60 cumulative weeks in theaters. Cinema fans regarded Nahin Abhi Nahin as one of best romantic and musical Urdu films with an innovative story theme.

Awards
Nahin Abhi Nahin won a Nigar award for the category of Special award for Faisal.

Impact
The film launched the careers of actors Faisal, Ayaz Naik, and Arzoo. After the release of Nahin Abhi Nahin, Faisal and Arzoo also appeared together in the popular Naaz Paan Masala commercial.

References

1980 films
Pakistani musical films
1980s Urdu-language films
Nigar Award winners
1980 romantic drama films
Pakistani romantic drama films
Urdu-language Pakistani films
Pakistani remakes of American films